Oxiana is the region surrounding the Amu Darya River which flows along Afghanistan's northern border separating it from Tajikistan and Uzbekistan before turning northwest into Turkmenistan to the Aral Sea.  In ancient times, the river was known as the Oxus in Greek.

Robert Byron wrote about Oxiana in his book The Road to Oxiana describing his ten-month-long journey to Persia and Afghanistan in 1933–34.

References

Regions of Afghanistan